Miguel Lourenço may refer to:

Miguel Lourenço (footballer, born 1920), Portuguese professional footballer
Miguel Lourenço (footballer, born 1992), Portuguese professional footballer